Lorentz Christian Langberg Holm (6 May 1892 – 30 March 1981) was a Norwegian politician for the Conservative Party.

He was born in Rakkestad  in Østfold, Norway.

He was elected to the Norwegian Parliament from Hordaland in 1950, and was re-elected on three occasions. He had previously served as a deputy representative in the period 1945–1949.

Holm was deputy mayor of Kvinnherad municipality in 1945–1947.

References

1892 births
1981 deaths
People from Østfold
People from Rakkestad
Conservative Party (Norway) politicians
Members of the Storting
20th-century Norwegian politicians